Witold Friemann (20 August 1889 in Konin – 22 March 1977 in Laski) was a Polish composer, pianist, conductor and pedagogue. He was very prolific and composed more than 350 Opuses, most of which remain inedited.

Compositions

Stage 
 Giewont, musical drama (dramat muzyczny; libretto by Kazimierz Brończyk; 1927-1929, 1934)
 Kain, opera (1952)
 Kasia, baśń operowa (1955)
 Bazyliszek (legenda warszawska), vaudeville (1958)

Vocal 
 Psalm VIII for soloists, chorus and orchestra, text by Jan Kochanowski (1910)
 Psalm XXX for soloists, chorus and orchestra, text by Jan Kochanowski (1921)
 Psalm XC for chorus, text by Jan Kochanowski (1922)
 Suita podhalańska for baryton solo and string orchestra (1946/1950)
 Polskie misterium ludowe for soloists, mixed chorus and piano, text by Maria Konopnicka (1946)
 4 suity mazowieckie for soloists, mixed chorus and orchestra (1948–51)
 Spod Warszawy for soloist, mixed chorus and orchestra (1949)
 Cień Chopina for baryton, piano and orchestra, text by Kazimierz Przerwa-Tetmajer (1949)
 Rapsod mazowiecki for soloist, mixed chorus and orchestra (1950)
 Pacem in terris (pro memoria Joannes XXIII, Op.253, for mixed chorus and orchestra (1963)
 Cudne oczy (second version) for soprano (or tenor) and orchestra (1967)
 Litania o zjednoczenie chrześcijan, Op.316, for mixed chorus and orchestra (1969)
 Litania o zjednoczenie ludzkości, Op.318, for soprano, tenor, baryton, bass, female, male and mixed choruses and orchestra (1969)
 Cudne oczy (third version) for soprano (or tenor) and orchestra (1970)
 Równy krok for mixed chorus and orchestra (1971)
 Piosenka o Koninie for mixed chorus a cappella (1971)
 Didache for chorus and piano (1974)
 Hymn dla Polski for chorus and piano (1976)

Orchestral 
 Konrad Wallenrod, symphonic poem (1908)
 Inwokacja for 12 winds and timpani (1926)
 Funeral march (1928)
 Symphony No. 1 Słowiańska (1948)
 Symphony No. 2 Sinfonietta Mazowiecka (1950)
 2 suity chłopskie (1952)
 Symphony No. 3 (1953)
 Suita mazowiecka (1956)

Concertant 
 Piano Concerto No. 1 Koncert-fantazja, Op.16 (1910-1913)
 Cień Chopina, fantasy for piano and orchestra, Op.77 (1937)
 Cello Concerto (1950)
 Piano Concerto No. 2 (1951)
 Piano Concerto No. 3 (1952)
 Viola Concerto No. 1, Op.175 (1952)
 Violin Concerto (1954)
 Piano Concerto No. 4 (1956)
 Clarinet Concerto No. 1 (1960)
 Oboe Concerto Concerto lirico (1961)
 Clarinet Concerto No. 2 (1961)
 Concerto for soprano and orchestra (1961)
 Concerto for 2 pianos solo (1962)
 Piano Concert No. 5 Concerto impetuoso (1963)
 Flute Concerto (1963)
 Bassoon Concerto (1963)
 Concertino for 2 pianos solo (1963)
 Concerto for tenor trombone and orchestra No. 1 Concerto eroico (1966)
 Horn Concerto, for french horn in F and orchestra (1966–68)
 Trumpet Concerto (1967)
 Viola Concerto No. 2, for viola solo, string orchestra, timpani and cymbals (1968)
 Concerto for 2 bassoons and orchestra (1968)
 Concerto for tenor trombone and orchestra No. 2 (1969)
 Concerto for bass trombone and orchestra (1969–70)
 Double bass Concerto, Op.329 (1970)
 Cztery pieśni rycerskie, Concertino for viola and harp with flute, oboe, clarinet, 2 bassoons, contrabassoon and percussion (1970)
 Tańce polskie for clarinet and orchestra (1975)

Chamber 
 Violin Sonata No. 1 Sonata polska (1912)
 Elegy for cello and piano (1913)
 Nokturne for violin and piano (1921)
 Romance for violin and piano (1922)
 Opowieść wschodnia for oboe, violin, cello and piano (1931)
 String Quartet No. 1 Rapsod śląski (1932)
 Prelude for cello and piano (1933)
 4 pieśni rycerskie, suite for viola and harp or piano (1935)
 Suita antica for violin and piano (1935)
 Viola Sonata (1935)
 Mazurek for violin and piano (1939)
 Oberek for violin and piano (1939)
 3 pieces for viola and piano (1940–47)
 String Quartet No. 2 (1942)
 Piano Quintet No. 1, with clarinet (1943)
 Violin Sonata No. 2 (1947)
 2 Romances for violin and piano (1947)
 Clarinet Sonata No. 1 Quasi una sonata (1949)
 Polska suita for violin and piano, in A major (1950)
 String Quartet No. 3 (1953)
 Wind Trio (1953)
 Suite for clarinet and piano (1953)
 Piano Quintet No. 2 (1954)
 Piano Quartet (1954)
 Prelude for violin and piano, in G minor (1954)
 Clarinet Sonata No. 2 (1959)
 Clarinet Sonata No. 3 Romantica (1959)
 Polska suita for flute and piano (1964)
 3 Mazurkas for violin and piano (1954)
 Improvisation for tenor trombone (1966)
 Taniec śląski for violin and piano (1967)
 I Suita kontemplacyjna (Contemplative suite No. 1) for trombone and piano (1968)
 Polonez majestatyczny for tuba and piano (1969)
 Danse a l’antique for flute and piano (1970)
 Myśli for viola and piano (1971)
 Choral for 4 trombones (1972)
 Suite for 4 trombones and bass drum (1972)
 Improvisation and Polonaise for clarinet and piano (1973)
 Nocturne for cello and piano, in G major (1974)
 Andante molto for clarinet and piano, in F major (1974)
 Mazurek for viola and piano, in G minor (1975)
 Suite for 4 trombones (1976)
 2 pieces for 3 trombones (1976)
 Kiedy ranne wstają zorze for 2 clarinets, 2 bassoons, contrabassoon, timpani and cymbals (1976)
 Duet-romanza for 2 trombones (1976).

Piano solo 
 Smutna opowieść (1910)
 Suita staroświecka (1927)
 Etude in seconds, Op.53 (1928)
 Opowieść morska (1943)
 Introduction and ballade (1948)
 18 Miniatures, Op.154 (1950)
 50 miniatur dwugłosowych (1966)
 50 utworów romantycznych: preludia, mazurki (1966)
 Quasi Notturno (1969)
 Preludium tragiczne (1969)
 Romance and Vita dolorosa (1975)
 Pensées tres tristet [?] (1976)
 Mazurkas, more than 160
 Preludes, more than 180

Organ 
 Muzyka w czasie Mszy św. (1944)

Songs with piano 
 Anioł, song for voice and piano, text by Michail Lermontov (1909)
 Modlitwa, song for voice and piano, text by Leopold Staff (1913)
 Pieśń czerkieska, song for voice and piano, text by Michail Lermontov (1922)
 Zwycięstwo, song for voice and piano, text by Rabindranath Tagore (1925)
 Cudne oczy, song for voice and piano, text by Kazimierz Przerwa-Tetmajer (1928)
 Pamiętam ciche, jasne, złote dnie, song for voice and piano, text by Kazimierz Przerwa-Tetmajer (1928)
 Noc majowa, song for voice and piano, text by Kazimierz Przerwa-Tetmajer (1928)
 Chanson d’automne, song for voice and piano, text by Paul Verlaine (1933)
 Cudne oczy (first version) for soprano (or tenor) and piano (1967)
 Gwiazdy w twych włosach for tenor (or soprano) and piano (1969)
 Przez dżungle i puszcze for tenor (or mezzo-soprano) and piano (1969)
 Dwa for tenor (or mezzo-soprano) and piano (1969)

Further reading 
 L. Markiewicz. O Witoldzie Friemannie. RM, vii/12 (1963), 6–7
 W. Bogdany. Rękopisy muzyczne Witolda Friemanna. Biuletyn informacyjny Biblioteki Narodowa (1967), no.4, pp. 29–32
 A. Nowak. Witold Friemann romantyk XX wieku. RM, xxii/11 (1978), 3–5
 A. Mitscha. Witold Friemann: życie i twórczość. Zeszyty naukowe [Academia muzyczna, Katowice], xvii (1980)
 A. Nowak. Witold Friemann: twórca liryki wokalnej. RM, xxiv/6 (1980), 3–4

External links 
 An article by Elżbieta Szczepańska-Malinowska in Encyklopedia muzyczna PWM
 An article by Marta Kotas
 An article by Małgorzata Kosińska
 A performance of Trombone Concerto No. 2

Polish composers
20th-century Polish pianists
People from Konin
1889 births
1977 deaths